Dyulino Pass is a mountain pass in the Balkan Mountains (Stara Planina) in eastern Bulgaria. It connects Varna and Aitos.

Mountain passes of Bulgaria
Balkan mountains
Landforms of Varna Province
Landforms of Burgas Province